Events in the year 2020 in Guyana.

Incumbents 

 President: Irfaan Ali
 Prime Minister: Mark Phillips

Events 

 11 March – The first case of COVID-19 in the country is reported: a 52-year-old woman suffering from underlying health conditions, including diabetes and hypertension. The woman died at the Georgetown Public Hospital, making her the first COVID-19 death in the country as well.
 18 March – All schools in the country were closed.
 19 March – The Guyana Civil Aviation Authority (GCAA) closed Guyanese airspace to all international arrivals.
 2 August – Irfaan Ali succeeds David Granger as the 10th President of Guyana.
12 September – Guayana Esequiba: Juan Edghill, Minister of Public Affairs, expresses confidence that the International Court of Justice (ICJ) will rule in Guyana's favor in the border dispute with Venezuela.

Deaths
7 April – John Percy Leon Lewis, 77, military officer; COVID-19
 25 August – Sase Narain, politician, former Speaker of the National Assembly (b. 1925).

See also
2020 in the Caribbean

References 

 
2020s in Guyana
Years of the 21st century in Guyana
Guyana
Guyana